Kimsa Chata or Kimsachata (Aymara and Quechua kimsa three, Pukina chata mountain, "three mountains", Hispanicized Quimsa Chata, Quimsachata) is an -long volcanic complex on a north–south alignment along the border between Bolivia and Chile, overseeing Chungara Lake. It contains three peaks, all stratovolcanoes.

The group is formed - from north to south - by Umurata, Acotango and Capurata (also known as Cerro Elena Capurata). The active volcano Guallatiri (Wallatiri) west of Capurata is not part of the group.

See also 
 List of volcanoes in Bolivia
 List of volcanoes in Chile
 Kuntur Ikiña

Sources

 

Stratovolcanoes of Chile
Complex volcanoes
Volcanoes of Oruro Department
Volcanoes of Arica y Parinacota Region
Glaciers of Bolivia
International mountains of South America
Bolivia–Chile border